Leivaha Pulu (born 27 March 1990) is a Tonga international rugby league footballer who plays as a  for the Norths Devils in the Hostplus Cup and is an extended Brisbane Broncos squad member.

He previously played for the Gold Coast Titans and the New Zealand Warriors in the NRL.

Background
Pulu was born in Auckland, New Zealand. He is of Tongan,  Maori and Greek descent.

He played his junior rugby league for the Marist Saints. He moved to Australia as a 16-year-old and attended Keebra Park State High School, before being signed by the Wests Tigers.

Playing career

Early career
In 2009 and 2010, Pulu played for the Wests Tigers' NYC team, before graduating to the Tigers' New South Wales Cup team, Western Suburbs Magpies in 2011. In 2012, he joined the Windsor Wolves. He had an off-season with Elite One Championship club Lezignan Sangliers before joining the Wyong Roos in 2013. After his 2014 season with the Roos, he was invited to do an NRL pre-season with the Sydney Roosters leading up to the 2015 NRL season, before returning to the Roos for the season. On 27 September 2015, he played in the Roos' 2015 New South Wales Cup Grand Final loss to the Newcastle Knights. On 13 October 2015, he signed a 1-year contract with the Gold Coast Titans starting in 2016.

2016
In Round 1 of the 2016 NRL season, Pulu made his NRL debut for the Titans against the Newcastle Knights.

2017
Pulu was named in the Titans squad for the 2017 NRL Auckland Nines.

2018

2019

References

External links

New Zealand Warriors profile
Gold Coast Titans profile
NRL profile

1990 births
Living people
Gold Coast Titans players
Marist Saints players
New Zealand sportspeople of Tongan descent
New Zealand rugby league players
New Zealand Warriors players
People educated at Keebra Park State High School
Rugby league players from Auckland
Rugby league props
Tonga national rugby league team players
Western Suburbs Magpies NSW Cup players
Windsor Wolves players
Wyong Roos players